Colonel William Montagu, 5th Duke of Manchester (21 October 177118 March 1843), styled Viscount Mandeville until 1788, was a British peer, soldier, colonial administrator and politician. He was Governor of Jamaica from 1808 to 1827, and Manchester Parish was named after him.

Background and education
Manchester was the eldest surviving son of George Montagu, 4th Duke of Manchester, and Elizabeth, daughter of Sir James Dashwood, 2nd Baronet. He was educated at Harrow and then served in the British Army, achieving the rank of colonel in 1794. 

In 1788, he succeeded his father to his titles and the Kimbolton Castle estate in Huntingdonshire.

Political career

Manchester was Governor of Jamaica from 1808 to 1827.  During his term, he oversaw the implementation of the abolition of the Slave Trade in the colony. In 1815, he dealt with the aftermath of the Port Royal fire and the devastation of Jamaican plantations by a hurricane.

Manchester Parish in Jamaica was named after him, while the capital of Mandeville was named after his son, Viscount Mandeville.

After his return to Britain Manchester served as Postmaster General between 1827 and 1830 (succeeding his younger brother Lord Frederick Montagu). He was also Lord Lieutenant of Huntingdonshire between 1793 and 1841.

Family
Manchester married Lady Susan Gordon, third daughter of Alexander Gordon, 4th Duke of Gordon, on 7 October 1793. They had eight children:

Lady Jane Montagu (1794–1815). 
George Montagu, 6th Duke of Manchester (1799–1855).
Lord William Francis Montagu (1800–1842), married Emily, third daughter of James Du Pre
Lady Georgiana Frederica Montagu (1803–1892), married Evan Baillie and had issue.
Lady Elizabeth Montagu, married Thomas Steele and had issue, including Thomas Montagu Steele
Lady Susan Montagu (c. 1801–1870), married George Hay, 8th Marquess of Tweeddale and had issue.
Lady Caroline Catherine Montagu (c. 1804–1892), married John Calcraft and had issue.
Lady Emily Montagu (1806–1827). Died in Naples while convalescing with Elizabeth Gordon, Duchess of Gordon

The Duchess Susan caused a social scandal by eloping with one of her footmen. According to The Complete Peerage, "it is mentioned in the Memoirs of a Highland Lady, under date 1812, that 'the Duchess had left home years before with one of her footmen.' Lady Jerningham wrote, 6 September 1813: 'the Duchess of Manchester is finally parted from her husband, her conduct becoming most notoriously bad'". Having become a social outcast, Susan died at Eaton, Edinburgh, in August 1828, at age 54.

Manchester survived his wife by fifteen years and died in Rome, Italy, in March 1843, at age 71. He was succeeded in the dukedom by his son, George.

References

1771 births
1843 deaths
William 2
People educated at Harrow School
Governors of Jamaica
Lord-Lieutenants of Huntingdonshire
William Montagu, 05th Duke of Manchester
United Kingdom Postmasters General